The B.P. John Administrative Building is a building on the now defunct Marylhurst University campus, in Marylhurst, Oregon, United States. It was designed by Joseph Jacobberger and completed in 1929. The building originally housed the entire college, and included an auditorium, a bakery and cafeteria, a chapel, classrooms, a gymnasium, a library, and a swimming pool. The second floor originally had living areas for the Sisters of the Holy Names. The 100-seat music venue Wiegand Hall was added during the 1990s. In 2013, the building's chapel was renovated. The university closed in late 2018.

References

External links

 

1929 establishments in Oregon
Marylhurst University
University and college administration buildings in the United States
University and college buildings completed in 1929